Legehare train station was the main railway station in Addis Ababa, Ethiopia, the terminal station of the metre-gauge Ethio-Djibouti Railway that connected Ethiopia's capital to the Port of Djibouti.  Completed in 1917, the station was a central part of the city and the main source of traffic into the city.  The style of the station is French, reflecting the nationality of its builders.  The station is no longer in operation, as the metre-gauge railway has been largely superseded by the standard-gauge Addis Ababa–Djibouti Railway completed in 2017.  The standard-gauge station is located in the outskirts of Addis Ababa.

References 

Buildings and structures in Addis Ababa
Defunct railway stations
Railway stations in Ethiopia
Railway stations opened in 1917
19th-century establishments in Ethiopia
19th-century architecture in Ethiopia
20th-century architecture in Ethiopia